Lin Yi-ying (born 7 July 1992) is a Taiwanese politician. A member of the New Power Party. She has served as a councillor of Tainan City Council since 2018. She was elected councillor representing Tainam City District 7 during the local elections.

Early life
Lim was born on 7 July 1992, and was raised in Taichung City. She attended National Wen-Hua Senior High School and National Cheng Kung University. She joined the Zero Two Club and served as its president. She was given a major demerit during a protest against the school, which was later revoked. She has participated in Sunflower Student Movement, anti-media monopoly campaigns, and has also been elected as the president of university students.

Political career
She took office as councillor of Tainan City in 2018, on Constitution Day, which coincides with Christmas Day.

In February 2019, Lin contested an open seat on the New Power Party's executive committee. Lin was also elected to the New Power Party's executive council on 29 August 2020.

See also
 New Power Party

References

External links
 
 Councillor Lin Yi-ying, Tainam City Council.

1992 births
Living people
21st-century Taiwanese politicians
Politicians of the Republic of China on Taiwan from Taichung
21st-century Taiwanese women politicians
New Power Party politicians
Tainan City Councilors
National Cheng Kung University alumni
Women local politicians